Bruesewitz v. Wyeth LLC, 562 U.S. 223 (2011), is a United States Supreme Court case that decided whether a section of the Vaccine Act of 1986 preempts all vaccine design defect claims against vaccine manufacturers.

Background
Hannah Bruesewitz, the daughter of the main petitioners in the case, received Wyeth's Tri-Immunol DTP vaccine as part of childhood immunizations. The Bruesewitzes claimed that Hannah's seizures and later developmental problems came from the vaccine. They filed suit in the "Vaccine Court", a special court within the United States Court of Federal Claims. Their petition was dismissed for failure to prove a link between the vaccine and Hannah's health problems.

They proceeded to sue in Pennsylvania state court. The case was removed to the local federal court, which held that the claim was preempted by a section of the National Childhood Vaccine Injury Act of 1986. The Third Circuit Court of Appeals affirmed. A petition for a writ of certiorari was granted on March 8, 2010, bringing the case to the Supreme Court.

In briefings before the Court, both sides argued over the specific language of the statutory provision.

Decision 
The case was decided on February 22, 2011. The Court, in a 6-2 opinion by Justice Antonin Scalia, held that the "plaintiffs design defect claims [were] expressly preempted by the Vaccine Act." Thus, the court affirmed laws that vaccine manufacturers are not liable for vaccine-induced injury or death if they are "accompanied by proper directions and warnings."

Justices Sonia Sotomayor and Ruth Bader Ginsburg dissented.

See also 
 List of United States Supreme Court cases, volume 562

References

External links 
 
  SCOTUSBlog Case Page
  Complete Oral Argument Audio and Transcript

Vaccination in the United States
2011 in United States case law
Vaccination law
Wyeth
United States Supreme Court cases
United States Supreme Court cases of the Roberts Court